Castrop-Rauxel, often simply referred to as Castrop by locals, is a former coal mining city in the eastern part of the Ruhr Area in Germany.

Geography
Castrop-Rauxel is located in Germany between Dortmund to the southeast, Bochum to the southwest, Herne to the west, Recklinghausen to the northwest, Datteln to the north and Waltrop to the northeast.

Urban area

The city is divided into 15 districts, from north to south and within one line from west (southwest) to east (northeast):

 Henrichenburg (Becklem)
 Pöppinghausen, Habinghorst, Ickern
 Bladenhorst, Rauxel, Deininghausen
 Behringhausen, Castrop, Dingen
 Obercastrop, Schwerin 
 Bövinghausen, Merklinde, Frohlinde

The total area of the city divided into different uses (31 December 2010):

Population figures for the individual districts (Stand: 2005):

History
Castrop-Rauxel was first mentioned in 834 as "Villa Castorpe",. The name could be derived from the germanic words trop meaning "village" and kast meaning "barn" or "depot". Rauxel is the name of the northern part of the city. Rauxel was a village which was integrated into the city in 1926. It was first mentioned as "Rouksele" in 1266. This name might be derived from the germanic words rouk meaning "crow" and sel meaning "meadow".

In 1847 the railway line from Cologne to Minden was opened and a railway station was built in the north of the village Castrop. The railway proved to be very useful for the economical development of the village. The first coal mine (Zeche Erin) was inaugurated by William Thomas Mulvany, an Irish industrialist living in Germany, close to the village in 1869. Another six coal mines were founded around Castrop soon afterwards. Between 1874 and 1878 another railway line was built between Duisburg and Dortmund with two train stations in the south of Castrop which developed into a mining town at the end of the 19th century. 

Castrop merged with two other municipalities (Obercastrop and Behringhausen) and attained municipal status in 1902 with 13, 917 inhabitants. On April 1, 1926 Castrop-Rauxel was formed when Castrop merged with 10 other municipalities the biggest of which was Rauxel with 19,800 inhabitants.  The number of inhabitants of  Castrop-Rauxel amounted to 53,399 in 1926. 

During World War II, a plant at Castrop-Rauxel used the Bergius process to produce synthetic oil products. During World War II Castrop-Rauxel suffered 35 air raids and 24% of the city was destroyed by bombs. In 1961 Castrop-Rauxel had 87,910 inhabitants, its maximum in history. In 1975, the village of Henrichenburg was annexed and Castrop-Rauxel became part of the Recklinghausen (district).  In 1984 the last of 7 coal mines at Castrop-Rauxel ("Erin") closed. As a consequence, the number of inhabitants declined.

Sights
Bladenhorst Castle (Wasserschloss Bladenhorst) was built in the 16th century. Saint Lambert Church, the oldest church in Castrop-Rauxel, stems from the 12th century. Another Saint Lambert Church built around 1450 in a late gothic style can be visited in Henrichenburg which became a part of Castrop-Rauxel in 1975. Goldschmieding Castle (Haus Goldschmieding) which was built in the 16th century was transformed into a hotel with a restaurant. The Town Hall was built from 1971 to 1975. The area of the former coal mine Zeche Erin was transformed into a park.

Around the Market Place Altstadtmarkt several houses built in the typical style of Gründerzeit can be seen. During this period Castrop-Rauxel was a flourishing mining town. Mulvany, the industrialist who founded the first coal mine, had a race course laid out in Castrop in 1874. In 1912, a memorial was erected with a memorial fountain (Reiterbrunnen) referring to the horse races which were held until 1970.

Parks
Stadtgarten Park was laid out in the south of the centre in 1931. In the north of Castrop-Rauxel, Landschaftsarchäologischer Park Henrichenburg is worth a visit. It was laid out around the foundations of a castle which had been first mentioned in 1263 and dismantled in 1787. The foundations were rediscovered by chance during construction works in 1994. Ceramics, tiles and weapons were unearthened before the foundations were covered with earth again. Hedges were planted on the foundations to give an impression of the dimensions of the castle.

Politics
The current mayor of Castrop-Rauxel is Rajko Kravanja of the Social Democratic Party (SPD) since 2015. The most recent mayoral election was held on 13 September 2020, with a runoff held on 27 September, and the results were as follows:

! rowspan=2 colspan=2| Candidate
! rowspan=2| Party
! colspan=2| First round
! colspan=2| Second round
|-
! Votes
! %
! Votes
! %
|-
| bgcolor=| 
| align=left| Rajko Kravanja
| align=left| Social Democratic Party
| 13,101
| 49.3
| 11,640
| 66.7
|-
| bgcolor=| 
| align=left| Oliver Lind
| align=left| Christian Democratic Union
| 6,674
| 25.1
| 5,823
| 33.3
|-
| 
| align=left| Manfred Fiedler
| align=left| The Greens/FWI/The Left
| 4,422
| 16.6
|-
| bgcolor=| 
| align=left| Mario Rommel
| align=left| Independent
| 1,213
| 4.6
|-
| bgcolor=| 
| align=left| Nils Bettinger
| align=left| Free Democratic Party
| 1,160
| 4.4
|-
! colspan=3| Valid votes
! 26,570
! 98.7
! 17,463
! 98.8
|-
! colspan=3| Invalid votes
! 359
! 1.3
! 210
! 1.2
|-
! colspan=3| Total
! 26,929
! 100.0
! 17,673
! 100.0
|-
! colspan=3| Electorate/voter turnout
! 60,039
! 44.9
! 60,007
! 29.5
|-
| colspan=7| Source: City of Castrop-Rauxel (1st round, 2nd round)
|}

List of mayors
Lord Mayors
 1926–1933: Mende, Centre Party (Germany) (Mayor, from 1928 Lord Mayor)
 1933–1945: Richard Anton, NSDAP
 1945–1946: Arnold Boerboom
 1946–1948: Hubert Krehe, CDU
 1948–1971: Wilhelm Kauermann, SPD
 1971–1975: Hugo Paulikat, SPD

Mayors
 1975–1989: Hugo Paulikat, SPD
 1989–1999: Hans Ettrich, SPD
 1999–2004: Nils Kruse, CDU
 2004–2015: Johannes Beisenherz, SPD
 since 2015: Rajko Kravanja, SPD

City council

The Castrop-Rauxel city council governs the city alongside the Mayor. The most recent city council election was held on 13 September 2020, and the results were as follows:

! colspan=2| Party
! Votes
! %
! +/-
! Seats
! +/-
|-
| bgcolor=| 
| align=left| Social Democratic Party (SPD)
| 10,256
| 38.9
|  1.3
| 20
| ±0
|-
| bgcolor=| 
| align=left| Christian Democratic Union (CDU)
| 7,059
| 26.8
|  3.9
| 14
|  1
|-
| bgcolor=| 
| align=left| Alliance 90/The Greens (Grüne)
| 3,988
| 15.1
|  7.1
| 8
|  4
|-
| 
| align=left| Independent Citizens' Party (UBP)
| 1,146
| 4.3
|  0.3
| 2
| ±0
|-
| 
| align=left| Free Voter Initiative (FWI)
| 1,132
| 4.3
|  3.2
| 2
|  2
|-
| bgcolor=| 
| align=left| The Left (Die Linke)
| 1,021
| 3.9
|  1.4
| 2
|  1
|-
| bgcolor=| 
| align=left| Free Democratic Party (FDP)
| 1,014
| 3.8
|  0.5
| 2
| ±0
|-
| bgcolor=| 
| align=left| Die PARTEI
| 775
| 2.9
| New
| 2
| New
|-
! colspan=2| Valid votes
! 26,391
! 98.2
! 
! 
! 
|-
! colspan=2| Invalid votes
! 486
! 1.8
! 
! 
! 
|-
! colspan=2| Total
! 26,877
! 100.0
! 
! 52
!  2
|-
! colspan=2| Electorate/voter turnout
! 60,039
! 44.8
!  2.5
! 
! 
|-
| colspan=7| Source: City of Castrop-Rauxel
|}

Transport
Castrop-Rauxel has access to three major highways, the Emscherschnellweg A 42,the Sauerlandlinie A 45 and the A 2.
There are 3 railway stations within the city. The central station (Castrop-Rauxel Hauptbahnhof) on the Cologne-Minden Railway is located in the suburb of Rauxel.  Connecting Castrop-Rauxel to the western Ruhr cities like Duisburg, Oberhausen, Essen, Gelsenkirchen, Herne and in the east to Dortmund and Hamm. 
The unmanned stations of Castrop-Rauxel South (Castrop-Rauxel Süd) and Castrop-Rauxel Merklinde on the Duisburg-Ruhrort–Dortmund railway have hourly services with trains to Dortmund, Herne and Dorsten. 
Located in the city centre is the central bus station Muensterplatz. From here passengers can travel to almost all suburbs and to neighboring  cities like Herne, Dortmund and Bochum. 
The Rhine-Herne Canal runs right through Castrop-Rauxel; Castrop-Rauxel also has a small Yacht club on this body of water.

Twin towns – sister cities

Castrop-Rauxel is twinned with:

 Wakefield, England, United Kingdom (1949)
 Vincennes, France (1961)
 Kuopio, Finland (1965)
 Zehdenick, Germany (1990)
 Nowa Ruda, Poland (1991)
 Trikala, Greece (2013)
 Zonguldak, Turkey (2013)

Economy
Castrop-Rauxel has been attempting to change from a former mining city to a city with a modern lifestyle, high recreational value, new economy companies, a 27-hole golf course, and various cultural events. Despite those efforts, the town has one of the lowest median incomes per capita in North Rhine-Westphalia.

Metalworking and electronics are the key manufacturing sectors.

Culture
The WLT (Westphalian State Theater) is the oldest and most relevant source of theatrical entertainment in Castrop-Rauxel. There is one cinema with two screens in Castrop.
Castrop’s history is closely connected to horse racing, the Reiterbrunnen in the very center of Castrop’s market square is a reminder of the race days on the Naturhindernisbahn, now part of the Goldschmieding Park.

Notable people 
 Hedwig Kiesekamp (1844–1919), singer and writer
 Heinrich Haslinde (1878–1938), local poet
 Josef Hermann Dufhues (1908–1971), politician CDU) Member of Landtag North Rhine-Westphalia, NRW Interior Minister and President of the Parliament
 Wilhelm Specht (1910–1986) entrepreneur, businessman and association official
 Heinz Ballensiefen (1912–?), historian and Nazi functionary who used to investigate the "Jewish question"
 Hermann Paschasius Rettler (1915–2004), bishop of Bacabal (Brazil)
 Alfred Niepieklo (1927–2014), German Football Champion in 1956 and 1957
 Josef Reding (born 1929), writer
 Erwin Weiss (1934–2008), singer
 Friedhelm Wentzke (born 1935), canoeist
 Dietrich Berke (1938–2010), musicologist and publishing editor
 Paul Reding (born 1939), painter, sculptor and writer
 Werner Trzmiel (born 1942), athlete
 Friedhelm Ost (born 1942), journalist and politician
 Klaus Fichtel (born 1944), footballer
 Gabriele Sikora (born 1950), politician (SPD), 1995–2010 Member of the Landtag of North Rhine-Westphalia
 Lawrence Schlieker (born 1951), abbot of Benedictine Gerleve
 Udo Helmbrecht (born 1955), former President of the BSI (Federal Office for Information Security) and Managing Director ENISA (European Network and Information Security Agency)
 Mathias Schipper (born 1957), footballer
 Hans-Peter Villis (born 1958), manager
 Inge Blask (born 1959), politician (SPD), since 2012 Member of Parliament
 Wolfram Wuttke (1961–2015), football player
 Dieter Hecking (born 1964), football coach
 Bernd "Bernie" Blume (born 1964), tech entrepreneur
 Michael Ostrzyga (born 1975), composer and conductor
 Marcel Sieberg (born 1982), cyclist
 Barış Özbek (born 1986), footballer
 Marc-André Kruska (born 1987), footballer
 Semih Güler (born 1994), footballer
 Rana Tokmak (born 1996) rhythmic gymnast
 Electric Callboy, electronicore band formed in 2010. 5 out of 6 members reside in Castrop

References
Notes

Oil campaign of World War II
Towns in North Rhine-Westphalia
Recklinghausen (district)